Chironia is a genus of flowering plants in the family Gentianaceae, native to southern Africa. It is named after Chiron, the centaur known for his use of medicinal plants, as number of Chironia species are used in traditional medicines.

Species
Currently accepted species include:

Chironia albiflora Hilliard
Chironia angolensis Gilg
Chironia arenaria E.Mey.
Chironia baccifera L.
Chironia baumiana Gilg
Chironia decumbens Levyns
Chironia elgonensis Bullock
Chironia erythraeoides Hiern
Chironia fernandesiana Paiva & I.Nogueira
Chironia flexuosa Baker
Chironia gratissima S.Moore
Chironia jasminoides L.
Chironia katangensis De Wild.
Chironia krebsii Griseb.
Chironia laxa Gilg
Chironia laxiflora Baker
Chironia linoides L.
Chironia melampyrifolia Lam.
Chironia palustris Burch.
Chironia peduncularis Lindl.
Chironia peglerae Prain
Chironia purpurascens (E.Mey.) Benth. & Hook.f.
Chironia serpyllifolia Lehm.
Chironia stokoei I.Verd.
Chironia tetragona L.f.

References

Gentianaceae
Gentianaceae genera